Evaline is an unincorporated community in Washington, United States, south of Napavine and 3 miles north of Winlock on State Route 603.

History
The earliest white settlers in this area were the Urquharts and the MacDonalds. Sedate W. Porter founded the town and established the post office on Feb. 14, 1906, which was open until 1930. The Northern Pacific Railroad began operations from Kalama to Evaline, a 25 miles stretch, in 1872.

The town was named after Porter's wife, Evaline. However, the name was registered misspelled as "Eveline" and the railroad company used the incorrect spelling for some time.

Government and politics

Politics

Evaline is recognized as being majority Republican and conservative.

The results for the 2020 U.S. Presidential Election for the Evaline East and Evaline West voting districts were as follows:

 Donald J. Trump (Republican) - 408 (72.08%)
 Joe Biden (Democrat) - 146 (25.80%)
 Jo Jorgensen (Libertarian) - 9 (1.59%)
 Howie Hawkins (Green) - 1 (0.18%)
 Write-in candidate - 2 (0.35%)

Education

The Evaline School district began in 1883 and oversees the two-room K-6 Evaline Elementary School. Middle school and high school students attend schools in Winlock.

References

Populated places in Lewis County, Washington
Unincorporated communities in Lewis County, Washington
Unincorporated communities in Washington (state)